Adnan Siddiqui (born 23 October 1969) is a Pakistani actor, producer and model who has worked in Lollywood and Hollywood and also made his debut in Bollywood with the Hindi film Mom (2017). He also has his own production house, Cereal Entertainment, churning out serials like Aadat and Ghughi. After PTV's classical drama Aroosa, he played a supporting role in Mere Paas Tum Ho.

Early life and education
He is the youngest in a family of eight children, born in Lahore where his father moved from Uttar Pradesh before shifting the whole family to Karachi some time after the birth of Adnan. His nephew is the actor Asad Siddiqui.

Siddiqui was educated at the St. Patrick's High School, Karachi.

Career
He has appeared in many commercials and drama serials, including Aroosa, Pal Do Pal, Meri Adhoori Mohabbat, Meri Zaat Zara-e-Benishan, Doraha, Hawa Rait Aur Aangan, Choti Si Kahani, Vasl and Parsa. Siddiqui first started his filming career in the 1990s; he became notable for being cast in the popular drama Uroosa and one of the famous travel reality shows of the time Gulls & Guys directed by Shoaib Mansoor. In 2002, he was nominated for Best Actor (TV) in the Lux Style Awards and was its red carpet host. He also played a small role alongside Angelina Jolie and Irrfan Khan in the 2007 film A Mighty Heart. In 2010, Siddiqui won Best Supporting Actor Award for Ishq Junoon Deewangi on Pakistan Media Award. He made his debut in Pakistani film Yalghaar. Siddiqui has acted in the roles that were better suited for the young actors and he admitted that "people ask why I act with women half my age".

Filmography
 

Adnan Siddiqui is featuring in Kashan Admani's directorial debut, Carma - The Movie. The movie is a crime thriller based on a kidnapping and features Zhalay Sarhadi, Naveen Waqar, and more.

Another expected project of Siddiqui is Umro Ayyar- A New Beginning is going to be released in 2022. This movie is a thriller based on a Persian legend Umro Ayyar featuring Usman Mukhtar, Sanam Saeed, Faran Tahir & more.

He also made his film production debut for film Dum Mastam which starrs Imran Ashraf and Amar Khan in lead roles and is expected to release on the occasion of Eid-ul-Fitr in 2022.

Television

As an actor

As a producer
As a producer, he has produced several television series and upcoming feature film, Dum Mastam under his production banner, Cereal Productions.
Seeta Bagri
Pujaran
Jalti Baarish
Aadat
Ghughi
Saiyaan Way
Mein Na Janoo (co-produced with Momina Duraid
Ghamandi
Dum Mastam (feature film)

Awards and nominations

Lux Style Awards

References

External links

 

Living people
Muhajir people
Pakistani male film actors
Pakistani male television actors
Pakistani television producers
Pakistani male models
St. Patrick's High School, Karachi alumni
Male actors from Karachi
1969 births
Male actors in Urdu cinema